Bellport is a station along the Montauk Branch of the Long Island Rail Road, at Bellport Station Road and Montauk Highway in North Bellport, New York.

History
The station was originally built in the summer of 1882 by the Brooklyn and Montauk Railroad, an LIRR subsidiary designed to expand the former South Side Railroad of Long Island toward the east end. When Hagerman station was closed by the LIRR in 1929, the railroad advised travelers to use this station as a substitute. Twenty-nine years later, on October 6, 1958 the Brookhaven station was closed, sending commuters of that station here as well. Bellport's station house was closed in January 1959 and razed in May 1964, replaced with a shelter-shed. The LIRR was planning to close this station on March 16, 1998 along with ten other stations, due to low ridership, but decided to keep it open due to community opposition. A depot with a high-level platform was built between 1998 and 1999, as many stations on the LIRR were getting at the time.

Station layout
The station has one high-level platform on the south side of the two tracks, long enough for one and a half cars to receive and discharge passengers. The north track, not next to the platform, is a siding. Unlike other stations, this station has neither a ticket vending machine nor a ticket office.

References

External links 

1962 Photograph (Arrt's Arrchives)
Unofficial LIRR Photography Pages - Bellport Station
 Station from Station Road from Google Maps Street View

Long Island Rail Road stations in Suffolk County, New York
Brookhaven, New York
Railway stations in the United States opened in 1882
1882 establishments in New York (state)